Atuba Park is a park located in Curitiba, state of Paraná, Brazil.

References

External links
 Atuba Park (in Portuguese)

Parks in Curitiba